The Greatest Love is a 1920 American silent drama film directed by Henry Kolker and starring Vera Gordon, Bertram Marburgh and Sally Crute. The film follows the fortunes of an Italian immigrant family the Latinis who arrive in New York around the turn of the century. It built on Gordon's previous role as a long-suffering Jewish mother in Humoresque.

Cast
 Vera Gordon as 	Mrs. Lantini
 Bertram Marburgh as Mr. Lantini
 Yvonne Shelton as	Francesca Lantini
 Hugh Huntley as 	Lorenzo Lantini
 William H. Tooker as 	Mr. Manton
 Raye Dean as 	Dorothy Manton
 Donald Hall as 	Richard Sewall
 Sally Crute as Mrs. Sewall
 Jessie Simpson as Mrs. McCarthy

References

Bibliography
 Connelly, Robert B. The Silents: Silent Feature Films, 1910-36, Volume 40, Issue 2. December Press, 1998.
 Erens, Patricia. The Jew in American Cinema. Indiana University Press, 1984.
 Munden, Kenneth White. The American Film Institute Catalog of Motion Pictures Produced in the United States, Part 1. University of California Press, 1997.

External links
 

1920 films
1920 drama films
1920s English-language films
American silent feature films
Silent American drama films
American black-and-white films
Films directed by Henry Kolker
Selznick Pictures films
Films set in the 1900s
Films set in New York City
1920s American films